Allahabad (also Romanized as Allāhābād) is a village in Daland Rural District, in the Central District of Ramian County, Golestan Province, Iran. At the 2006 census, its population was 185, in 45 families.

References 

Populated places in Ramian County